The Medal "In Commemoration of the 850th Anniversary of Moscow" is a commemorative medal of the Russian Federation created to denote the 850th anniversary of the city of Moscow.  It was established on 26 February 1997 by Presidential Decree № 132.  Its statute was defined on 21 March 1997 by Presidential Decree 223.

Medal statute 
The Medal "In Commemoration of the 850th Anniversary of Moscow" is awarded to participants in the defence of Moscow who were awarded a medal for the defence of Moscow, wartime workers who worked in Moscow during the Great Patriotic War of 1941–1945, persons who were awarded the Soviet Medal "In Commemoration of the 800th Anniversary of Moscow"; citizens who have made a significant contribution to the development of the city of Moscow.

Presidential Decree 1099 of 7 September 2010 removed the Medal "In Commemoration of the 850th Anniversary of Moscow" from the list of state awards of the Russian Federation. It is no longer awarded.

Medal description 
The Medal "In Commemoration of the 850th Anniversary of Moscow" is a 32 mm in diameter circular brass medal.  Its obverse bears the image of Saint George on horseback spearing a dragon.  On the left side of the obverse, following the medal circumference, the relief inscription "Moscow 850".  On the reverse, a laurel wreath over the entire circumference save the very top, in its center the inscription in relief "1147" over the inscription "1997".

The medal is suspended by a ring through the award's suspension loop to a standard Russian pentagonal mount covered with a 24 mm wide overlapping red silk moiré ribbon with 2 mm wide white, blue and red stripes on the right edge.

Notable recipients (partial list) 
The individuals below were recipients of the Medal "In Commemoration of the 850th Anniversary of Moscow".
 Rustem Devletovich Zhantiev, scientist
 Azary Abramovich Lapidus, Doctor of Science
 Tatiana Pankratova, order "For Love and Patience" (2016), title "Veteran of Labor" (2003) 
 Major GeneralIgor Sergun
 Alexander Prokhorov, physicist
 Igor Ivanov, politician
 Colonel Vladimir Zhirinovsky, politician
 Mikhail Fradkov, politician
 Ramzan Kadyrov, President of Chechnya 
 Irina Rodnina figure skater and Olympic gold medalist
 Yury Luzhkov, politician, former mayor of Moscow
 Nikolay Fyodorov, former Justice Minister of Russia and former President of the Chuvash Republic
 General Anatoly Kvashnin
 Boris Lagutin, boxer
 Elina Bystritskaya, actress
 Viktor Gerashchenko, chairman of the Russian Central Bank
 General Yuri Baluyevsky
 Viktor Pugachyov, test pilot
 Alexander Dzasokhov, former head of the Republic of North Ossetia–Alania 
 Fleet Admiral Vladimir Kuroyedov
 Alexander Alexeyevich Chekalin, First Deputy Minister of the Interior 
 Viktor Sadovnichiy, mathematician
 General Nikolay Bordyuzha, politician
 Vladimir Zeldin, actor
 Aleksey Aleksandrov, lawyer, businessman and politician
 Georgy Boos, businessman, politician and former governor of the Kaliningrad Oblast
 Irina Muravyova actress 
 Valery Shumakov, surgeon
 Mikhail Kharit, architect
 Alexander Gavrilenko, cardiac surgeon

See also 
 Medal "In Commemoration of the 800th Anniversary of Moscow"
 Awards and decorations of the Russian Federation
 City of Moscow
 Battle of Moscow

References

External links 
 Official site of the Commission under the President of the Russian Federation on State Awards In Russian
 The Russian Gazette  In Russian

Civil awards and decorations of Russia
Russian awards
History of Moscow
Awards established in 1997
Awards disestablished in 2010
1997 establishments in Russia
2010 disestablishments in Russia